Mucilaginibacter roseus is a Gram-negative, aerobic, rod-shaped and non-motile bacterium from the genus of Mucilaginibacter which has been isolated from the Caohu River in Taiwan.

References

External links
Type strain of Mucilaginibacter roseus at BacDive -  the Bacterial Diversity Metadatabase

Sphingobacteriia
Bacteria described in 2016